The 1981 South American Rugby Championship was the twelfth edition of the competition of the leading national Rugby Union teams in South America.

The tournament was played in Montevideo and won by Uruguay. Argentina didn't participate.

Standings 

{| class="wikitable"
|-
!width=165|Team
!width=40|Played
!width=40|Won
!width=40|Drawn
!width=40|Lost
!width=40|For
!width=40|Against
!width=40|Difference
!width=40|Pts
|- bgcolor=#ccffcc align=center
|align=left| 
|3||3||0||0||164||17||+ 147||6
|- align=center
|align=left| 
|3||2||0||1||69||39||+ 30||4
|- align=center
|align=left| 
|3||1||0||2||52||90||- 38||2
|- align=center
|align=left| 
|3||0||0||3||6||145||- 139||0
|}

Results 

First round

Second round

Third round

Notes and references

 IRB – South American Championship 1981

1981
1981 rugby union tournaments for national teams
rugby union
rugby union
rugby union
rugby union
International rugby union competitions hosted by Uruguay